Alavanja is a surname found in Croatia and Serbia.

Notable people with the surname include:
 Goran Alavanja (1963–1990), Croatian Serb policeman killed in the Log Revolution
 Lazo Alavanja (born 1977), American soccer player
 Slobodan Alavanja (born 1985), Serbian politician

Croatian surnames
Serbian surnames